U. australis  may refer to:
 Uromyrtus australis, a small tree species found in Australia
 Utricularia australis, a medium-sized, perennial aquatic bladderwort species with a vast geographic range

See  also
 Australis (disambiguation)